Hans Christer Holund (born 25 February 1989) is a Norwegian cross-country skier who represents Lyn.

Holund won the 10 km classical at Junior World Championships in 2008, and debuted in the FIS Cross-Country World Cup in Lahti on 8 March 2009.

At the Norwegian National Championships in 2016, Holund was on the SFK Lyn team with Jonas Udjus Frorud and Simen Hegstad Krüger that won the 3 × 10 km relay.

Holund won the gold medal at the 2021 World Championship in Oberstdorf in 15 km freestyle individual.

Cross-country skiing results
All results are sourced from the International Ski Federation (FIS).

Olympic Games
 2 medals – (1 silver, 1 bronze)

Distance reduced to 30 km due to weather conditions.

World Championships
 6 medals – (4 gold, 2 bronze)

World Cup

Season standings

Individual podiums
2 victories – (2 )
20 podiums – (13 , 7 )

Team podiums
 2 victories – (2 ) 
 7 podiums – (7 )

References

External links
 
 

1989 births
Living people
Norwegian male cross-country skiers
Cross-country skiers at the 2018 Winter Olympics
Cross-country skiers at the 2022 Winter Olympics
Olympic cross-country skiers of Norway
Tour de Ski skiers
Medalists at the 2018 Winter Olympics
Medalists at the 2022 Winter Olympics
Olympic silver medalists for Norway
Olympic bronze medalists for Norway
Olympic medalists in cross-country skiing
FIS Nordic World Ski Championships medalists in cross-country skiing
Skiers from Oslo
21st-century Norwegian people